The Women's time trial track cycling events at the 2008 Summer Paralympics took place on September 7–8 at the Laoshan Velodrome.

Classification
Cyclists are given a classification depending on the type and extent of their disability. The classification system allows cyclists to compete against others with a similar level of function.

Cycling classes are:
B&VI 1–3: Blind and visually impaired cyclists
LC 1–4: Cyclists with a locomotor disability
CP 1–4: Cyclists with cerebral palsy

B&VI 1–3

The women's 1 km time trial (B&VI 1–3) took place on September 7.

WR = World Record

LC1–2/CP 4
The women's 500m time trial (LC1–2/CP 4) took place on September 8.

LC3–4/CP 3
The women's 500m time trial (LC 3–4/CP 3) took place on September 8.

References 

Women's time trial
Para